Haimen railway station (Chinese: 海门站) is a railway station in Haimen District, Nantong, Jiangsu, China. Situated north of the urban core of Haimen, it is an intermediate station on the Nanjing–Qidong railway. It was opened on 5 January 2019.

Services
The initial service level was three trains to Nantong and three to Qidong per day. Provision has since improved. With the opening of the Nantong–Shanghai railway in July 2020, direct services to Shanghai Hongqiao and Hangzhou South were introduced.

References

Railway stations in Jiangsu
Railway stations in China opened in 2019